Tchaoudjo Athlétic Club is a Togolese football club based in Sokodé. They play in the top division in Togolese football. Their home stadium is Stade Municipal.

Current squad

Football clubs in Togo
Football clubs in Sokodé